E+ or e+ may refer to:

 A positron, which has the symbol .
 An E augmented triad, a chord in music.